Muhammad Amirul Haziq bin Rasmizal (born 19 March 1998) is a Malaysian footballer who plays as a defender.

Club career

Early year

Amirul Haziq played his youth football at Frenz United club before being scouted by Selangor. He joined Selangor as a youth player at the age of 18.

Selangor
Meanwhile, he gradually progressed through the club's youth teams, and was part of the reserve team that won the President Cup in 2017. He also finished the season with 12 appearances and just scoring one goal. On 27 November 2017, Selangor under-21 manager, Ariffin Ab Hamid confirmed that Amirul would be definitely promoted to Selangor's first team for 2018 season.

Career statistics

Club

1 Includes Malaysia FA Cup matches.
2 Includes Malaysia Cup matches.
3 Includes AFC Cup matches.

Honours

Club
Selangor
 President Cup (1): 2017

References

External links
 Profile at faselangor.my

1998 births
Living people
Malaysian footballers
Selangor FA players
Malaysia Super League players
Malaysian people of Malay descent
People from Selangor
Association football wingers
Association football midfielders